Thomas Gill Vickery (May 5, 1867 in Milford, Massachusetts – March 21, 1921 in Burlington, New Jersey), nicknamed "Vinegar Tom", was a professional baseball player who played pitcher in the Major Leagues in -. He would play for the Baltimore Orioles, Philadelphia Phillies, and Chicago Colts.

External links

1867 births
1921 deaths
Major League Baseball pitchers
Philadelphia Phillies players
Baltimore Orioles (NL) players
Chicago Colts players
19th-century baseball players
Toronto Canucks players
Milwaukee Brewers (minor league) players
Omaha Omahogs players
Nashville Tigers players
Springfield Ponies players
Springfield Maroons players
Buffalo Bisons (minor league) players
Warren (minor league baseball) players
Hartford Bluebirds players
New Bedford Whalers (baseball) players
Worcester (minor league baseball) players
New Britain Rangers players
Hartford Cooperatives players
Newark Colts players
Rochester Bronchos players
Utica Pentups players
Bristol Bell Makers players
Bristol Bellmakers players
Baseball players from Massachusetts